The Trust That Went Bust (Trest, kotoryy lopnul) is a Soviet 1983 musical TV miniseries (total runtime 196 min) based on short stories by O. Henry: "The Octopus Marooned", "Jeff Peters as a Personal Magnet", "Modern Rural Sports", "The Hand That Riles the World", "The Exact Science of Matrimony", and "The Ethics of Pig". Directed by Aleksandr Pavlovsky. Screenplay by Igor Shevtsov

Cast 
 Regimantas Adomaitis as Andy Tucker (voiced-over by Aleksandr Demyanenko on dialogue and Pavel Smeyan in songs)
 Nikolai Karachentsov as Jeff Peters
 Leonid Kuravlyov as Farmer Ezra Plunkett
 Mikhail Svetin as Doorman Klein
 Irina Ponarovskaya as Pseudo-Sarah Bernhardt
 Vladimir Basov as Pseudo-John Pierpont Morgan
 Yuri Mazhuga as Bill Humble
 Pavel Vinnik as The storeowner
 Yelena Aminova as Female secretary at the ministry
 Vsevolod Abdulov as Joe Blassome
 Tamara Yatsenko as The widowed Miss Trotter (voiced-over by Natalya Andrejchenko)
 Viktor Ilyichov as Ruf Tattum
 Gennadi Yalovich as The postman
 Boris Novikov as The artillerist
 Lev Perfilov as The keyhole-peeping con artist
 David Makarevsky as The Mayor
 Aleksandr Pavlovsky as The Mayor's nephew
 Viktor Pavlovsky as The policeman
 Mikhail Muromov as The busker
 Ingrīda Andriņa as Mrs. Ezra Plunkett
 Oleg Fedulov as Drunk man (uncredited)
 Leonid Anisimov
 Viktor Andriyenko
 Valeri Bassel
 Boris Astankov
 Vitaly Derkach
 Sergey Zinchenko
 Georgy Derevyansky
 Igor Tiltikov
 Gennady Butrov

Songs in the film 
 Composer - Maksim Dunayevsky
 Lyrics by Naum Olev (1-3 parts), Leonid Filatov (1st part)

External links

1983 films
1980s Russian-language films
Soviet television miniseries
Odesa Film Studio films
Soviet musical drama films
1980s Soviet television series
Adaptations of works by O. Henry
1980s musical drama films
Films scored by Maksim Dunayevsky
1980s television miniseries
1983 drama films